The Peterson J-4 Javelin is an American, single seat, mid-wing glider that was designed by Max A. Peterson in the late 1960s and produced by the Peterson Sailplane Corporation in small numbers. The glider was type certified and put into production in 1973.

Design and development
Peterson designed the J-4 based on lessons he learned with his earlier Peterson Medena design. The J-4 is a single seater, but can carry a child in the small seating area behind the pilot.

The J-4's fuselage is made from steel tube with the lower part covered in a fiberglass shell and the upper part sheet aluminium. The wing is built around a chem-milled tubular spar and is assembled predominantly with pop rivets. The wing has no ailerons and instead roll control is via upper surface spoilerons that eliminate virtually all adverse yaw. Spoilers are also provided for glide-path control. The landing gear is a monowheel.

First flown in 1969, the J-4 was Federal Aviation Administration type certified on 6 February 1973. A pilot production run of eight examples was completed, but production was not continued. Poly Industries of Ontario, California produced aircraft under licensing agreement from Peterson Sailplane Corporation, who held the type certificate.

Operational history
In 1983, six of the original eight built were reportedly still flying and there were still six registered in April 2011.

Specifications (variant specified)

See also

References

External links
Photos and article about the J-4
Photo of J-4
Photo of J-4

1960s United States sailplanes
Aircraft first flown in 1969